Pleading the Blues is an album by Chicago blues harp player Junior Wells.

Background and recording 
The first collaboration of Junior Wells and his long-time friend Buddy Guy dated back to the early 60s. Their first album Hoodoo Man Blues was recorded in 1965. They entered into the Condorcet Studios in Toulouse, France on October 31, 1979, when Buddy Guy was pleased to record an album with the French producer, Didier Tricard. To release those recordings, Tricard founded a new label; which was named Isabel by Buddy Guy, in honor of his mother. They recorded 13 songs for two different albums only in one day. One of them was released as a Buddy Guy album titled The Blues Giant, the other one was released as a Junior Wells album, titled Pleading the Blues. Junior Wells played only on his album, but the other musicians are the same on both albums. Buddy Guy and his little brother Phil Guy played guitars, J. W. Williams played bass, Ray "Killer" Allison drums. All lead guitars played by Buddy Guy, except "Cut Out the Lights" & the first lead of "I Smell Something" by Phil Guy.

Releases 
It was originally released on the French label Isabel in 1979, titled Pleading the Blues. It was first released on CD by Isabel in 1990, including a bonus track. It was first released in the U.S. in 1993, on CD by Evidence, but with alternate track order.

Track listing 
All tracks written by Junior Wells, except where noted
 "Pleading the Blues" – 7:36
 "It Hurts Me Too" (Hudson Whittaker  Tampa Red) – 4:20
 "Cut Out The Lights" – 7:40
 "Just for My Baby" – 4:06
 "Quit Teasing My Baby" – 4:24
 "I'll Take Care of You" (Brook Benton) – 6:45
 "Take Your Time Baby" – 4:02
CD bonus track
 "I Smell Something" – 8:56

Personnel 
Junior Wells – harmonica, vocals
Buddy Guy – guitars
Phil Guy – guitars
J.W. Williams – bass
Ray Allison – drums

References 

1979 albums
Junior Wells albums